Schadler is a surname. Notable people with the surname include:

Jay Schadler, American television reporter
Linda Schadler, American materials scientist and academic administrator
Robert Schadler, American politician and businessman

See also
Schädler
Schaller (surname)